The Embassy of Italy in Kyiv is the diplomatic mission of Italy in Ukraine.

History 
Following Ukrainian independence on August 24, 1991, Italy recognized Ukraine on December 28, 1991. On January 29, 1992, diplomatic relations between Ukraine and Italy were established.

Previous Ambassadors
 Vittorio Claudio Surdo (1992-1996)
 Gian Luca Bertinetto (1996-2000)
 Jolanda Brunetti Goetz (2000-2004)
 Fabio Fabbri (2004-2007)
 Pietro Giovanni Donnici (2007-2012)
 Fabrizio Romano (2012–2016)
 Davide La Cecilia (2016–2021)
 Pier Francesco Zazo (2021–present)

See also 
 Italy-Ukraine relations
 Foreign relations of Italy
 Foreign relations of Ukraine
 Embassy of Ukraine, Rome
 Diplomatic missions in Ukraine
 Diplomatic missions of Italy

References

External links 
 Ministry of Foreign Affairs of Ukraine
 Embassy of Italy in Kyiv

Italy
Kyiv
Italy–Ukraine relations